Ryan McKenna may refer to:

 Ryan McKenna (baseball) (born 1997), American baseball outfielder 
 Ryan McKenna (politician) (born 1973), American politician in Missouri
 Ryan McKenna (filmmaker), Canadian filmmaker